Aulacospermum is a genus of flowering plants in the family Apiaceae, with 15 accepted species. It is endemic to Central Asia and Eastern Europe.

Species 

 Aulacospermum anomalum (Ledeb.) Ledeb.
 Aulacospermum darwasicum (Lipsky) Schischk.
 Aulacospermum gonocaulum Popov
 Aulacospermum gracile Pimenov & Kljuykov
 Aulacospermum ikonnikovii Kamelin
 Aulacospermum multifidum (Sm.) Meinsh.
 Aulacospermum pauciradiatum (Boiss. & Hohen.) Kljuykov, Pimenov & V.N.Tikhom.
 Aulacospermum plicatum Pimenov & Kljuykov
 Aulacospermum popovii (Korovin) Kljuykov, Pimenov & V.N.Tikhom.
 Aulacospermum roseum Korovin
 Aulacospermum schischkinii V.M.Vinogr.
 Aulacospermum stylosum (C.B.Clarke) Rech.f. & Riedl
 Aulacospermum tenuisectum Korovin
 Aulacospermum tianschanicum (Korovin) C.Norman
 Aulacospermum turkestanicum (Franch.) Schischk.

References

Apioideae
Apioideae genera